Gnesio-Lutherans (from Greek γνήσιος [gnesios]: genuine, authentic) is a modern name for a theological party in the Lutheran churches, in opposition to the Philippists after the death of Martin Luther and before the Formula of Concord. In their own day they were called Flacians by their opponents and simply Lutherans by themselves. Later Flacian became to mean an adherent of Matthias Flacius' view of original sin, rejected by the Formula of Concord. In a broader meaning, the term Gnesio-Lutheran is associated mostly with the defence of the doctrine of Real Presence.

Locations 

The centres of Gnesio-Lutherans were Magdeburg and the University of Jena.

Notable proponents 

Other Gnesio-Lutherans were Caspar Aquila, Joachim Westphal, Johann Wigand, Matthäus Judex, Joachim Mörlin, Tilemann Heshusius, Johann Timann, Simon Musaeus, Erasmus Sarcerius, and Aegidius Hunnius.

Controversies 

After the death of Luther, many theological controversies arose among the Lutherans, mostly due to teaching of Philip Melanchthon. Gnesio-Lutherans were profiled by defending Martin Luther's doctrine, in the beginning led by Matthias Flacius. The Gnesio-Lutherans exercised strict doctrinal discipline, but they also opposed with equal determination what they considered to be the errors of their fellow-combatants like von Amsdorf (Amsdorfians), Flacius (Flacians), Andreas Poach, and others.

Gnesio-Lutherans were involved in:

 the Adiaphoristic controversy,
 the Majoristic controversy (Nicolaus von Amsdorf, Nicolaus Gallus),
 the second Antinomian controversy (Andreas Poach, Anton Otto),
 the Synergistic controversy (Matthias Flacius, Nicolaus Gallus),
 the Osiandrian controversy, and 
 the Crypto-Calvinistic controversy.

The Crypto-Calvinistic controversy was the largest of the controversies of the second generation of the Lutheran Reformation.  Since it was far more fundamental to the Lutheran Church, Lutherans outside of the Flacian party took the Gnesio-Lutheran position against Philippism and Crypto-Calvinism. In the middle between the Philippists and the Gnesio-Lutherans, the "Centrist party" included Johannes Brenz, Jakob Andreae, Martin Chemnitz, Nikolaus Selnecker, David Chytraeus, Andreas Musculus, and others.  Unlike the Gnesio-Lutherans, the members of the "centre party" were opposed to any unnecessary controversies involving no doctrinal differences, and careful not to fall into any extreme position themselves. The Gnesio-Lutheran Joachim Westphal was first to write to defend the Real Presence against the Calvinists, and Melanchthon stigmatized his and other Gnesio-Lutherans' doctrine as "bread worship".

Notes

References 

 
 
 
 
 

Lutheran Eucharistic theology
Reformation in Germany